Esmailabad (also Romanized as Esmā‘īlābād; also known as Esmā‘īlābād-e Khafrak and Esma‘il Abad Khafrak) is a village in Khafrak-e Olya Rural District, Seyyedan District, Marvdasht County, Fars Province, Iran. At the 2006 census, its population was 213, in 56 families.

References 

Populated places in Marvdasht County